Minmini (born 1970) is a South Indian film playback singer.

Minmini may also refer to:

 Minmini (film), a 1953 Tamil language film
 Minmini, a working title for the 2017 Indian Tamil psychological thriller film Ratsasan